Amphia hepialoides is a moth of the family Noctuidae first described by Achille Guenée in 1852. It is found in Ethiopia.

References

Endemic fauna of Ethiopia
Moths described in 1852
Amphia
Insects of Ethiopia
Moths of Africa